Synchiropus is a genus of fish in the family Callionymidae found mainly in the tropical waters of the Indo-Pacific region.

Species
There are currently 44 recognized species in this genus:
 Synchiropus atrilabiatus (Garman, 1899) (Antler dragonet)
 Synchiropus bartelsi R. Fricke, 1981 (Bartel's dragonet)
 Synchiropus circularis R. Fricke, 1984 (Circled dragonet)
 Synchiropus claudiae R. Fricke, 1990 (Claudia's dragonet)
 Synchiropus corallinus (C. H. Gilbert, 1905) (Exclamation point dragonet)
 Synchiropus delandi Fowler, 1943 (Deland's dragonet) 
 Synchiropus goodenbeani (Nakabo & Hartel, 1999) (Pale-fin dragonet)
 Synchiropus grandoculis R. Fricke, 2000 (Western Australian big-eye dragonet) 
 Synchiropus grinnelli Fowler, 1941 (Philippines dragonet)
 Synchiropus hawaiiensis R. Fricke, 2000 (Hawaiian big-eye dragonet)
 Synchiropus kamoharai (Nakabo, 1983)
 Synchiropus kanmuensis (Nakabo, Yamamoto & C. H. Chen, 1983) (Kanmu dragonet) 
 Synchiropus kinmeiensis (Nakabo, Yamamoto & C. H. Chen, 1983) (Kinmei dragonet) 
 Synchiropus kiyoae R. Fricke & Zaiser, 1983 (Kiyo's dragonet)
 Synchiropus laddi L. P. Schultz, 1960 (Ladd's dragonet)
 Synchiropus lateralis (J. Richardson, 1844) (Chinese ornate dragonet)
 Synchiropus lineolatus (Valenciennes, 1837) (Indian ornate dragonet)
 Synchiropus marmoratus (W. K. H. Peters, 1855) (Marbled dragonet)
 Synchiropus minutulus R. Fricke, 1981 (Minute flag-fin dragonet)
 Synchiropus monacanthus J. L. B. Smith, 1935 (Deep-water dragonet)
 Synchiropus morrisoni L. P. Schultz, 1960 (Morrison's dragonet)
 Synchiropus moyeri Zaiser & R. Fricke, 1985 (Moyer's dragonet)
 Synchiropus novaecaledoniae R. Fricke, 1993 (West Jumeau big-eye dragonet)
 Synchiropus novaehiberniensis R. Fricke, 2016 (New Ireland dragonet) 
 Synchiropus orientalis (Bloch & J. G. Schneider, 1801)
 Synchiropus orstom R. Fricke, 2000 (Orstom dragonet)
 Synchiropus phaeton (Günther, 1861) (Phaeton dragonet)
 Synchiropus picturatus (W. K. H. Peters, 1877) (Picturesque dragonet)
 Synchiropus postulus J. L. B. Smith, 1963 (Dwarf dragonet)
 Synchiropus rameus  (McCulloch, 1926) (High-finned dragonet)
 Synchiropus randalli G. T. Clark & R. Fricke, 1985 (Randall's dragonet)
 Synchiropus richeri R. Fricke, 2000 (Richer's dragonet)
 Synchiropus rosulentus J. E. Randall, 1999 (Rosy dragonet)
 Synchiropus rubrovinctus (C. H. Gilbert, 1905) (Tiny Hawaiian dragonet)
 Synchiropus sechellensis Regan, 1908 (Seychelles dragonet)
 Synchiropus signipinnis R. Fricke, 2000 (Chesterfield big-eye dragonet)
 Synchiropus splendidus (Herre, 1927) (Mandarin dragonet)
 Synchiropus springeri R. Fricke, 1983 (Springer's dragonet)
 Synchiropus stellatus J. L. B. Smith, 1963 (Starry dragonet)
 Synchiropus sycorax Y. K. Tea & A. C. Gill, 2016 (Ruby dragonet) 
 Synchiropus tudorjonesi G. R. Allen & Erdmann, 2012 (Red-back dragonet) 
 Synchiropus valdiviae (Trunov, 1981) (Valdivia dragonet)
 Synchiropus zamboangana Seale, 1910 (Zamboangan dragonet)

References

 
Callionymidae
Marine fish genera
Taxa named by Theodore Gill